Avri is a given name. Notable people with the name include:

Avri Gilad (born 1962), Israeli media personality
Avri Ran (born 1955), Israeli activist, criminal, and entrepreneur
Avri Levitan (born 1973), Israeli violist and director